Damian de Montemas is an Australian actor.

Career
D de Montemas won the 2009 AFI Award for Best Supporting Actor in a miniseries for his portrayal of Brian Alexander in Underbelly: a Tale of Two Cities.

D de Montemas attended and graduated from Western Australian Academy of Performing Arts (WAAPA).

D de Montemas has portrayed Brian Alexander on Underbelly: A Tale of Two Cities and Jason Kennedy in the first two series of The Secret Life Of Us.

He also made appearances in All Saints, Blue Heelers and appeared as Henk Van Minnen on Home and Away.

On 30 August 2013, it was announced that de Montemas had joined the cast of Neighbours in the guest role of Alek Pocoli. He made his first screen appearance on 9 September.

Filmography
 Police Rescue – Greg (1995)
 Minty – Shane Conner (1998/1999)
 Chameleon II: Death Match – Lenz (1999)
 Farscape – Exodus from Genesis – Melkor (1999)
 The Cherry Orchard – Older Antoine (2003)
 Somersault – Adam (2004)
 Tom-Yum-Goong – Inspector Vincent (2005)
 Joanne Lees: Murder in the Outback – PC Bantan (2007)
 The Final Winter – Max (2007)
 Blame – Bernard (2010)
 Hounds of Love – Trevor (2016)
 Go! – Mike Zeta (2019)
 Sequin in a Blue Room (2019)

References

External links

Living people
Year of birth missing (living people)
AACTA Award winners
Australian male television actors
Australian people of Portuguese descent